State Route 74 (SR 74) is a north–south state highway located primarily in Bradley County, Tennessee. It runs from the Georgia state line to downtown Cleveland. The route serves as a major shortcut, along with SR 60, for Cleveland citizens to commute to Atlanta, Georgia.

The section of SR 74 from its southern terminus to US 64 in Cleveland is a signed secondary highway, with the rest of the route to its northern terminus an unsigned primary highway.

Route description

SR 74 begins at the Tennessee–Georgia state line and runs along the Bradley–Polk county line as Spring Place Road, continuing into Murray County as Georgia State Route 225. The route takes its name from Spring Place, an unincorporated community in Murray County on GA 225. The route immediately crosses the Conasauga River Basin and the Conasauga River, then veers to the northeast approximately  later, completely into Bradley County. The route then comes to an intersection with SR 313, which continues southeast to Oldfort, and enters the community of Wildwood Lake. The route continues for another  and comes to an interchange with APD-40 (US-64 Bypass/US 74/SR 311), and enters the city limits of Cleveland. The route continues for approximately  through East Cleveland, and comes to an intersection with SR 60 (Dalton Pike), and the route turns right, continuing north as Wildwood Avenue. Approximately  later the route comes to an intersection with US 64. Most maps show the route as ending here, but the Tennessee Department of Transportation (TDOT) lists the route as  continuing along concurrently with US 11 (Ocoee Street) through downtown Cleveland up to its split with the US 11 Bypass (Keith Street) in northern Cleveland.

History

Between early 2012 and late 2013, TDOT rebuilt the bridges over the Conasauga River and Basin, closing the route for several miles.

Major intersections

See also

References

074
Transportation in Bradley County, Tennessee
Transportation in Polk County, Tennessee